The Brave is an epithet applied to the following:

People:
 Alfonso VI of León and Castile (before 1040–1109), King of León, King of Castile and de facto King of Galicia
 Ashot IV of Armenia (died c. 1040–41), King of Armenia
 Bolesław I the Brave (967–1025), Duke of Poland, Duke of Bohemia (as Boleslav IV), and the first King of Poland
 Michael the Brave (1558–1601), Prince of Wallachia (1593–1601), of Transylvania (1599–1600), and of Moldavia (1600)
 Poto the Brave, Bavarian count palatine
 Thimo the Brave, Count of Wettin and Brehna (c. 1010–1090 or 1091 or c. 1100)
 Ulf the Brave, a Norwegian hersir (military leader) of the early ninth century

Fictional characters:
 Balder the Brave, a Marvel Comics character

See also
List of people known as the Courageous
List of people known as the Fearless
List of people known as the Valiant

Lists of people by epithet